A screed is a tool, guide or material used in construction.

Screed may also refer to:

 Free floating screed, used to flatten asphalt paving
 Power concrete screed, used to smooth and level freshly poured concrete surfaces
 Screed wire, a ground wire in electrical work

See also 
 Scree, rock fragments at the base of a cliff